The 8th parallel south is a circle of latitude that is 8 degrees south of the Earth's equatorial plane. It crosses the Atlantic Ocean, Africa, the Indian Ocean, Southeast Asia, Australasia, the Pacific Ocean and South America.

Two sections of the border between the Democratic Republic of the Congo and Angola are defined by the parallel. 

It passes through 10 out of the 26 states of Brazil.

Around the world
Starting at the Prime Meridian and heading eastwards, the parallel 8° south passes through:

{| class="wikitable plainrowheaders"
! scope="col" width="120" | Co-ordinates
! scope="col" | Country, territory or sea
! scope="col" | Notes
|-
| style="background:#b0e0e6;" | 
! scope="row" style="background:#b0e0e6;" | Atlantic Ocean
| style="background:#b0e0e6;" |
|-
| 
! scope="row" | 
|
|-valign="top"
| 
! scope="row" | 
| 
|-
| 
! scope="row" | 
|
|-valign="top"
| 
! scope="row" | 
| 
|-valign="top"
| 
! scope="row" |  /  border
|
|-
| 
! scope="row" | 
|
|-valign="top"
| 
! scope="row" |  /  border
| 
|-
| 
! scope="row" | 
|
|-valign="top"
| 
! scope="row" | 
| 
|-
| style="background:#b0e0e6;" | 
! scope="row" style="background:#b0e0e6;" | Lake Tanganyika
| style="background:#b0e0e6;" |
|-
| 
! scope="row" | 
|
|-
| style="background:#b0e0e6;" | 
! scope="row" style="background:#b0e0e6;" | Indian Ocean
| style="background:#b0e0e6;" | Passing just south of the island of Mafia, 
|-
| 
! scope="row" | 
| Island of Chole
|-
| style="background:#b0e0e6;" | 
! scope="row" style="background:#b0e0e6;" | Indian Ocean
| style="background:#b0e0e6;" |
|-
| 
! scope="row" | 
| Island of Java
|-
| style="background:#b0e0e6;" | 
! scope="row" style="background:#b0e0e6;" | Bali Sea
| style="background:#b0e0e6;" | Passing just north of the island of Bali, 
|-
| style="background:#b0e0e6;" | 
! scope="row" style="background:#b0e0e6;" | Flores Sea
| style="background:#b0e0e6;" | Passing just north of the island of Sumbawa, 
|-valign="top"
| style="background:#b0e0e6;" | 
! scope="row" style="background:#b0e0e6;" | Banda Sea
| style="background:#b0e0e6;" | Passing just north of the island of Flores,  Passing just north of the island of Alor, 
|-
| 
! scope="row" | 
| Islands of Liran and Wetar
|-
| style="background:#b0e0e6;" | 
! scope="row" style="background:#b0e0e6;" | Wetar Strait
| style="background:#b0e0e6;" | Passing just north of the island of Kisar, 
|-
| 
! scope="row" | 
| Island of Babar
|-
| style="background:#b0e0e6;" | 
! scope="row" style="background:#b0e0e6;" | Timor Sea
| style="background:#b0e0e6;" |
|-
| 
! scope="row" | 
| Island of Yamdena
|-
| style="background:#b0e0e6;" | 
! scope="row" style="background:#b0e0e6;" | Arafura Sea
| style="background:#b0e0e6;" |
|-
| 
! scope="row" | 
| Islands of Yos Sudarso and New Guinea
|-
| 
! scope="row" | 
| Island of New Guinea
|-
| style="background:#b0e0e6;" | 
! scope="row" style="background:#b0e0e6;" | Gulf of Papua
| style="background:#b0e0e6;" |
|-
| 
! scope="row" | 
| Island of New Guinea
|-
| style="background:#b0e0e6;" | 
! scope="row" style="background:#b0e0e6;" | Solomon Sea
| style="background:#b0e0e6;" |
|-
| 
! scope="row" | 
| Island of Ranongga
|-
| style="background:#b0e0e6;" | 
! scope="row" style="background:#b0e0e6;" | Solomon Sea
| style="background:#b0e0e6;" |
|-
| 
! scope="row" | 
| Island of Kolombangara
|-
| style="background:#b0e0e6;" | 
! scope="row" style="background:#b0e0e6;" | Kula Gulf
| style="background:#b0e0e6;" |
|-
| 
! scope="row" | 
| Island of New Georgia
|-
| style="background:#b0e0e6;" | 
! scope="row" style="background:#b0e0e6;" | New Georgia Sound
| style="background:#b0e0e6;" |
|-
| 
! scope="row" | 
| Santa Isabel Island
|-
| style="background:#b0e0e6;" | 
! scope="row" style="background:#b0e0e6;" | Pacific Ocean
| style="background:#b0e0e6;" | Passing just south of the island of Dai, 
|-
| 
! scope="row" | 
| Nukufetau atoll
|-valign="top"
| style="background:#b0e0e6;" | 
! scope="row" style="background:#b0e0e6;" | Pacific Ocean
|-valign="top"
| 
! scope="row" | 
| Island of Eiao
|-valign="top"
| style="background:#b0e0e6;" | 
! scope="row" style="background:#b0e0e6;" | Pacific Ocean
| style="background:#b0e0e6;" |
|-
| 
! scope="row" | 
|
|-valign="top"
| 
! scope="row" | 
| Acre Amazonas Rondônia Amazonas Mato Grosso Pará Tocantins Maranhão - for about 11 km Piauí Pernambuco Paraíba Pernambuco - passing just north of Recife
|-valign="top"
| style="background:#b0e0e6;" | 
! scope="row" style="background:#b0e0e6;" | Atlantic Ocean
| style="background:#b0e0e6;" | Passing just to the south of Ascension Island, 
|-
|}

See also
7th parallel south
9th parallel south

References

s08
Angola–Democratic Republic of the Congo border
Borders of the Cook Islands